Ernest R. Redmond (July 10, 1883—February 12, 1966) was a United States Army officer who served as acting Chief of the National Guard Bureau.

Early life
Ernest Rothemel Redmond was born in Salem, Massachusetts on July 10, 1883.  He was educated in Salem and became a real estate agent.

Redmond enlisted in the Massachusetts National Guard in 1904, and advanced through the noncommissioned officer ranks to Sergeant Major before receiving his commission as a Second Lieutenant in 1910.  A Field Artillery officer, Redmond was promoted to First Lieutenant in 1911 and Captain in 1913.  In 1914 Redmond was one of 1,700 National Guard members activated to take part in fighting the Great Salem Fire of 1914.  In 1916 he served on the Mexican border during the Pancho Villa Expedition.

World War I
At the start of World War I Redmond was commander of Battery E, 101st Field Artillery.  During the war he served in France, and was promoted to Major and commander of a battalion in the 101st Field Artillery.  He returned to Massachusetts in 1919.

Post World War I
Redmond resumed working in real estate after the war.  He also continued his National Guard career, receiving promotion to Lieutenant Colonel in 1920.  In 1921 was advanced to Colonel and commander of the 102nd Field Artillery Regiment.

A Republican, in 1925 Redmond was an unsuccessful candidate for Mayor of Salem.

National Guard Bureau
In 1926 Redmond went on active duty as Assistant to the Chief of the Militia Bureau.  He served as Acting Chief from June to September, 1929, following the retirement of Creed C. Hammond.

Later career
During World War II Redmond served at the War Department in the office of the Chief of Engineers.

Redmond later relocated to California and resumed work as a real estate broker.

Death and burial
Redmond died in San Francisco, California on February 12, 1966.  He is buried at Golden Gate National Cemetery, Plot 2C, 1161.

References

External links

1883 births
1966 deaths
People from Salem, Massachusetts
Massachusetts Republicans
Chiefs of the National Guard Bureau
United States Army personnel of World War I
United States Army personnel of World War II
National Guard (United States) colonels
Massachusetts National Guard personnel